Kininogen-1 (KNG1), also known as alpha-2-thiol proteinase inhibitor, Williams-Fitzgerald-Flaujeac factor or the HMWK-kallikrein factor is a protein that in humans is encoded by the KNG1 gene. Kininogen-1 is the precursor protein to high-molecular-weight kininogen (HMWK), low-molecular-weight kininogen (LMWK), and  bradykinin.

Expression 

The KNG1 gene uses alternative splicing to generate two different proteins: high-molecular-weight kininogen (HMWK) and low-molecular-weight kininogen (LMWK).  HMWK in turn is cleaved by the enzyme kallikrein to produce bradykinin.

 KNG1 gene →  low-molecular-weight kininogen (LMWK) protein (contains 427 amino acids) or high-molecular-weight kininogen (HMWK) protein (644 amino acids)
 HMWK protein → bradykinin peptide (9 amino acids)

Function 

HMWK is essential for blood coagulation and assembly of the kallikrein-kinin system. Also, bradykinin, a peptide causing numerous physiological effects, is released from HMWK. In contrast to HMWK, LMWK is not involved in blood coagulation.

Kininogen-1 is a constituent of the blood coagulation system as well as the kinin-kallikrein system.

See also 
 high-molecular-weight kininogen
 low-molecular-weight kininogen
 bradykinin

References

Further reading

External links 
 LMWK laboratory information

Coagulation system
Kinin–kallikrein system
Cofactors